The Royal Bavarian State Railways had, at different times, three different goods wagon classification systems that roughly correspond to the early, middle and late period of the state railway era in Bavaria:

 Epoch Ia - the early period from 1867 to 1892. The time when the main line network was established.
 Epoch Ib - the middle period from 1893 to 1912. The boom time for the branch lines.
 Epoch Ic - the late period from 1913 to 1920. The war years and aftermath until the formation of the Deutsche Reichsbahn.

In practice Epoch Ic may have extended into the mid-1920s because it would have taken time for practices to change and for wagons to be repainted. In Bavaria, this may have taken longer than elsewhere, because they were part of the independent 'Bavarian Group Administration', the only one of its kind in the Reichsbahn. The following sections explain the goods wagon classification schemes in the 3 epochs.

Epoch Ia (1867- 1892) – the first wagon classification scheme 
The first numbering system was introduced in 1867 and used capital letters for the various types of goods wagon as follows:

A = goods vans
B or BD = flat wagons for MOW-work – Bahndienstwagen
C = vans with steam boilers for train heating – Heizwagen
D or DW = guards vans for P and G trains – Dienstwagen
E = open wagons with high sides
F = open wagons with low sides, long
G = open wagons with low sides, short
H = timber trucks
J = luggage vans without guards compt – Gepäckwagen
K = double-deck livestock vans
L = low-sided open wagons for stone transport
M = peat wagons
N = horse vans
O = cattle wagons, covered or open

Photographs indicate that, initially, not all letters were used in their final meaning, but the system was fully developed by 1877 after the nationalization of the Bavarian Ostbahn. It was refined using indices – Roman or Arabic numbers – to designate old wagons built before 1859 or new, longer, vehicles built after 1880. E.g. an A I was an old, 6-wheeled, goods van for a load of 120 cwt whilst an A³ was a 10 m long “modern” van for 15t load (10t was ‘normal’). The owner inscription was K.Bay.Sts.B. with a rather square crowned Bavarian coat of arms (white and blue lozenges). An old-fashioned Antiqua-type was used.

Epoch Ib (1893-1912) – the second classification scheme 
In 1893 the K.Bay.Sts.B. introduced the intermediate system with capital letters showing the main type and small letters showing things like loading length, load, height of the sides etc. It was similar, but not identical, to the Prussian system; in particular the use of the small letters was quite different. The following table gives the type designations in combination with type description and the number range: 
 
V = livestock wagons (19001 – 20000) – Viehwagen
G = goods vans (30001 – 50000) – Gedeckte Güterwagen
O = open wagons (50001 – 70000) – Offene Güterwagen
H = timber trucks (70001 – 76000) – Holzwagen
S = platform wagons (76001 – 80000) – Schienenwagen
Special wagons, railway-owned (80001 – 85000)
Special wagons, private-owned (85001 – 90000)
Wagons of private railways (90001 onwards)
 
Examples of small letters used: 
 
l, p for long and very long vehicles
d, h for low and high sides
w, m for < and > 10t max load respectively
e, f, y etc. for special features of certain wagon types
 
Peculiarities of this system were also that double capitals were not only used for 8-wheeled vehicles, but also for 4-wheelers with 20 tons load and more (e.g. OOm(u), a 4-wheel iron coal wagon). Triple capitals - SSS - were used for heavy load 12-wheel well wagons. The owner inscription was K.Bay.Sts.B., now without a coat of arms. A type without serifs was used. 
In 1909 the German state railways agreed upon the joint use of their freight stock, and founded the German State Railway Wagon Association (Deutscher Staatsbahnwagenverband or DSV). Besides the standardization of goods wagons, standardized wagon numbering, based on the Prussian system, was introduced. As far as can be traced today, the Bavarians waited until 1912/13 before applying it to old wagons, because the yearly amendments to the wagon roster book (of 1903) say “future” for the new standardized designations. Furthermore, the standardized designations were altered for some wagon types between 1909 and 1912, when they were given their final meaning. (e.g. for Rungenwagen, SmlRu was planned first, but they became Rm eventually).

Epoch Ic (1912-1920) - the third classification scheme
From June 1912 the K Bay Sts B used a new naming and numbering scheme for goods wagons as follows:

1. Wagons based at a given station, (Stationswagen = DRG Heimatwagen) had the name of the division (Direktion) where they were based.

2. All wagons of the rechtsrheinisches Netz, east of the Rhine, which could be used freely

a) with less than 15 t load weight were designated Regensburg

b) with 15 t or more load weight and wheel sets of form 39 were designated Augsburg
 
c) with 15 t or more load weight and wheel sets of form 41 were designated Nürnberg
 
3. All wagons of the former Palatinate Railway (Pfalzbahn - west of the Rhine) were allocated Ludwigshafen
 
4. Private owner wagons received the name of the division where they were stationed.
 
5. All new wagons of the Verbandsbauart were designated München (except 1 is valid). 

In addition to renaming, wagons were re-numbered according to class, see below. The change of designations and in some cases also numbers was documented in a new edition of the wagon roster book. On one hand, the divisions were used for owner inscription (instead of K.Bay.Sts.B.), in combination with a coat of arms (this was Prussian practice too), on the other hand they were used for a kind of sorting. Wheel sets of Form 39 had 988mm Ø wheels and 145mm Ø axles. Wheel sets of Form 41 had 1000mm Ø wheels and 155mm diameter axles. The date given for the introduction of Gattungsbezirke is 1910. This coincided with the renumbering of Bavarian goods wagons, as follows: 
 
G wagons 30 001 – 44 000
N wagons 44 001 – 48 000
V and K wagons 48 001 – 50 000
O wagons 50 001 – 70 000
H wagons 70 001 – 76 000
R wagons 76 001 – 78 000
S wagons 78 001 – 81 000
Special wagons 81 001 – 82 000
X wagons 82 001 – 87 000
Private railway wagons 90 001 – 92 000
Railway tank wagons 500 000 – 501 999
Private tank wagons 502 000 – 504 999
Other private wagons 600 000 – 602 999
Railway departmental wagons 700 001 – 702 000
 
Although the livery of goods wagons was established as red-brown by the DSV with effect from 1 Jan 1911, the K.Bay.Sts.B. did not issue the instructions until 4 Apr 1912, so green wagons would presumably have been seen for some time after this. Unlike the DRG, the Bavarians used divisional names for generations rather than classes of wagon (however Würzburg was unused): 

1. Old generation 1844-1858: 4- and 6-wheeled wagons for loads below 10 tons. Withdrawn by the turn of the 19th/20th century.

2. Classic generation (mostly Regensburg) 1858-1891: 4-wheeled wagons for 10 tons load; and a handful of 6- and 8-wheelers (mainly platform wagons) for loads of 15 tons and more.

a. Short wagons 1858-1889, with an underframe length of around 7 m; the typical goods wagons of this period

b. Ostbahn wagons (1858–1875); the Bayerische Ostbahn was a large private railway company nationalized in 1876; wagons with some differences to those of the state railway.

c. Long wagons 1880-1890, with an underframe length of 10 m; mainly large-capacity vans and platform wagons.

d. Transition types 1888-1891; rather short goods wagons for 10 or 12.5 tons load, but with “modern” design features.

3. Modern generation 1892-1912: 4-, 6-, 8- and 12-wheeled wagons with a  max load of ≥15 t (prototypes for the well known Trix-models)

a. Augsburg. All-Bavarian types 1892-1909; already the same main dimensions as their Prussian counterparts, but with typical Bavarian design features (brakeman's cabs, openings for venting etc.).

b. Nürnberg. Transition types to the standardized designs of the Verbandsbauart 1909-1912; still typical Bavarian wagons with certain parts of the standardized designs (axleguards, wheelsets type 41); in most cases continuations of 3a, but in some cases (e.g. timber truck) direct forerunner of the standardized designs.

Literature
 Bayerische Nebenbahnen, Robert Zintl

See also
History of rail transport in Germany
Royal Bavarian State Railways
Bavarian branch lines

External links
 There is an English-language discussion forum at Railways of Germany

19th century in Bavaria
20th century in Bavaria
Rail transport in Bavaria
Rolling stock of Germany
Rail freight transport in Germany